Water monitor is a common name for the Asian water monitor, a lizard species in South and Southeast Asia. The name may also refer to:

 Nile monitor, a lizard species in Africa
 Water monitor or fire monitor, alternative names for deluge gun, a large firefighting device

See also
 Mertens' water monitor, lizard species in Australia
 Mitchell's water monitor, lizard species in Australia

Animal common name disambiguation pages